Seth Rance (born 23 August 1987) is a New Zealand cricketer who plays domestically for Central Districts. He made his international debut for the New Zealand cricket team in May 2017.

Domestic career
Along with Brent Arnel, he was the joint-highest wicket-taker in the 2016–17 Super Smash, with fifteen dismissals. In June 2018, he was awarded a contract with Central Districts for the 2018–19 season.

In December 2021, in the 2021–22 Super Smash, Rance took his first five-wicket haul in T20 cricket.

International career
In April 2017, he was named in New Zealand's One Day International (ODI) squad for the 2017 Ireland Tri-Nation Series. He made his ODI debut for New Zealand against Ireland on 14 May 2017. He made his T20I debut for New Zealand against the West Indies on 29 December 2017.

References

External links
 

1987 births
Living people
New Zealand cricketers
New Zealand One Day International cricketers
New Zealand Twenty20 International cricketers
Central Districts cricketers
Cricketers from Wellington City